Oxyopes cornutus is a species of lynx spider documented first by F. O. Pickard-Cambridge in 1902, and found in Mexico.

References 

Oxyopidae
Spiders of Mexico
Spiders described in 1902